Rainbow is the 70th album by American country singer Johnny Cash, his last for Columbia Records, released in 1985 (see 1985 in country music). "I'm Leaving Now", which was re-recorded 15 years later for Cash's American III: Solitary Man, was released as a single rather unsuccessfully, but the album's signature song is a cover of Kris Kristofferson's "Here Comes That Rainbow Again", which also appeared on Cash's 1995 collaboration with Kristofferson, Willie Nelson and Waylon Jennings - known as The Highwaymen - entitled The Road Goes on Forever, though it was sung solo by Kristofferson on the latter. Also included is a cover of Creedence Clearwater Revival's "Have You Ever Seen the Rain?," from Pendulum. The album also includes the song "Love Me Like You Used To," which was later recorded by fellow country singer Tanya Tucker, and became a country hit for her. Following the release of this album and a duet album with Jennings in 1986, Cash moved to Mercury Records as a result of Columbia's fading interest in his music, though he later returned to Columbia for the second Highwaymen album.

Track listing

Personnel 
Johnny Cash - vocals, guitar, backing vocals
Gene Chrisman, Jerry Carrigan - drums
Mike Leech, Jimmy Tittle - bass
Chips Moman, Reggie Young, James B. Cobb Jr., Jerry Shook, Barry Bailey - guitar
Bobby Emmons, Bobby Wood, Paul Davis - keyboards
Wayne Jackson, Jack Hale - horns
Marty Stuart - mandolin, guitar
Johnny Cash, June Carter Cash, Waylon Jennings, Paul Davis, Toni Wine, Chips Moman, Marty Stuart, Bobby Wood, James B. Cobb Jr. - backing vocals

Additional personnel
Produced by: Chips Moman
Engineers: David Cherry and Chips Moman
Assistant Engineer: Ken Criblez at Woodland Sound Studios, Nashville, Tn
Recorded at Moman's Recordings Studio, Nashville, Tn, and Woodland Sound Studios, Nashville, Tn
Mixed at Moman's Studio
Mastered by: Denny Purcell at Woodland Sound Studios, Nashville, Tn
Photography: Ron Keith, Scott Bonner
Design: Jeff Morris
Art Director: Virginia Team

External links
 Luma Electronic's Johnny Cash discography listing

Rainbow
Rainbow
Rainbow
Albums produced by Chips Moman